Inuktitut-English Pidgin was an Inuit pidgin used as a contact language in Quebec, Labrador, and neighboring areas of the eastern Arctic. It consisted of uninflected Inuktitut word stems arranged in an English SVO order. Thus for Inuit takuvagit "I see you" was pidgin uvanga taku ivvit.

References

 Marianne Mithun (2001) The Languages of Native North America, p 595

North America Native-based pidgins and creoles
Languages extinct in the 1960s
Culture of Quebec